Lee Braid (3 March 1888 – 11 November 1963) was an Australian cricketer. He played five first-class cricket matches for Victoria between 1912 and 1922.

See also
 List of Victoria first-class cricketers

References

External links
 

1888 births
1963 deaths
Australian cricketers
Victoria cricketers
Cricketers from Melbourne